Ronabea is a genus of flowering plants belonging to the family Rubiaceae.

Its native range is Tropical America.

Species:

Ronabea emetica 
Ronabea isanae 
Ronabea latifolia

References

Rubiaceae
Rubiaceae genera